The 1994 Copa Libertadores Final was a two-legged football match-up to determine the 1994 Copa Libertadores champion. The final was contested by Argentine club Vélez Sarsfield (that played its first final ever) and Brazilian São Paulo FC.  The first leg, held in José Amalfitani Stadium, Vélez beat Sao Paulo 1–0 while in the second leg, held in Estádio do Morumbi, Sao Paulo was the winner by the same score.

As both teams equaled in points and goal difference, a penalty shoot-out was conducted to decide a champion. After striker Palhinha missed his shot, Vélez Sarsfield won on penalties their first Copa Libertadores trophy.

Qualified teams

Venues

Match details

First leg

|}

Source

Second leg

Source

References

Copa Libertadores Finals
l
l
l
l
Football in Buenos Aires
l